Anisur Rahman Zico is a Bangladeshi footballer who plays as a goalkeeper for Bangladesh Premier League club Bashundhara Kings and the Bangladesh national football team. He is considered as penalty specialist in the country for his penalty saving ability. Being one of the best goalkeeper of Bangladesh, he is also called by the name 'Banglar Bajpakhi' (Bengali: বাংলার বাজপাখি) which means in English 'The hawk of Bangla'.

International career 
On 13 November 2020, Anisur made his senior debut against Nepal in an international friendly.

On 4 December 2020, Anisur performed well against reigning Asian champions Qatar national football team in 2022 FIFA World Cup qualification – AFC Second Round

Club career 
On 14 December 2018, Anisur Rahman Zico's performance in the shootout in Walton Independence Cup helped Bashundhara Kings edge a spirited Rahmatganj MFS 3–2 in tiebreak in the fourth quarterfinal.
On 20 December 2018, Zico's performance propelled Bashundhara Kings to the Independence Cup final with a 7–6 win on penalties over Dhaka Abahani. He also got limelight in the 2019–20 AFC Cup where he played crucial role for his team including 7 saves and penalty which helped his team to win by 5–1 against TC Sports Club

Career statistics

Club

International

References

External links 

1997 births
Living people
Bangladeshi footballers
Bangladesh international footballers
Bangladesh youth international footballers
Association football goalkeepers
Bashundhara Kings players
Saif SC players
Muktijoddha Sangsad KC players
Farashganj SC players
Abahani Limited (Chittagong) players
Footballers at the 2018 Asian Games
Asian Games competitors for Bangladesh
People from Cox's Bazar District
Bangladesh Football Premier League players